Acinetobacter oryzae is a bacterium from the genus of Acinetobacter which has been isolated from a rice plant (Oryza alta).

References

Moraxellaceae
Bacteria described in 2012